Sincé is a town and municipality located in the Department of Sucre, northern Colombia.
 	
San Luis de Sincé, is a town and municipality located in the Department of Sucre,  28 km (15 mi) southeast of Sincelejo, in northern Colombia. It has an average Temperature of 26,5°C (80°F).  Its main economic activities are agriculture, stockbreeding and commerce. It was founded November 10, 1775 by Antonio de Torre y Miranda.  Sincé is home to "Hospital Local Nuestra Señora del Socorro" and a Municipal Photo Gallery.

Celebrations and Events 
The biggest local celebrations are held in honor of the Virgen del Socorro (Our Lady of Perpetual Help), the city's patron Saint, and celebrated in September.  Other major celebrations include the Fiestas en Corralejas (Running of the Bulls) in January and La Semana de la Sinceanidad (Sincé Week), commemorating its founding in November.

References
 Gobernacion de Sucre - Sincé
 Sincé official website 
 lo que faltaba en la web!! 
 Spanish language Wikipedia entry

Sucre